Kachua Union is a union parishad in Jessore Sadar Upazila of Jessore District, in Khulna Division, Bangladesh.

References

Unions of Jessore Sadar Upazila